Gerald Vaughn (born April 8, 1970 in Abbeville, Mississippi) is a former Canadian Football League defensive back who played 13 seasons for four different teams. He was a two time All-Star. He attended the University of Mississippi.

References 

1970 births
Living people
American players of Canadian football
Calgary Stampeders players
Canadian football defensive backs
Hamilton Tiger-Cats players
Ole Miss Rebels football players
Ottawa Renegades players
People from Abbeville, Mississippi
Winnipeg Blue Bombers players